John Wick: Chapter 2 is a 2017 American neo-noir action thriller film directed by Chad Stahelski, written by Derek Kolstad, and starring Keanu Reeves as the title character, alongside an ensemble supporting cast including Common, Laurence Fishburne, Riccardo Scamarcio, Ruby Rose, Lance Reddick, Peter Stormare, Bridget Moynahan, Franco Nero, John Leguizamo, and Ian McShane. The film, a sequel to John Wick (2014) and the second installment in the John Wick franchise, centers on retired hitman John Wick, who is forced back into his old life to fulfill a blood oath to crime lord Santino D'Antonio (Scamarcio).

Following the box office success of the previous film, Stahelski and the first film's uncredited co-director David Leitch said a sequel film begun development in February 2015. Later that same month, Jon Feltheimer confirmed plans for additional John Wick properties to create a media franchise, and announced the return of Kolstad as the sequel's screenwriter. Principal photography began in October 2015 and lasted until early that following year, with filming taking place in Montreal, New Jersey, New York City, and Rome.

John Wick: Chapter 2 had its premiere at the Arclight Hollywood in Los Angeles on January 30, 2017, and was released in the United States on February 10, by Lionsgate. The film received generally positive reviews from critics, with praise for the action sequences, direction, editing, visual style, and the performances of the cast (particularly Reeves). It grossed over $171 million worldwide, becoming the then-highest grossing film in the franchise. A sequel, John Wick: Chapter 3 – Parabellum, was released in May 2019.

Plot

John Wick recovers his stolen Boss 429 Mustang from Abram Tarasov, the late Viggo's brother. John dispatches Tarasov's men in a violent rampage that heavily damages the Mustang, but spares Tarasov under the promise of peace, and returns home. John has his Mustang taken for repairs by chop-shop owner Aurelio.

John is visited by the Camorra crime boss Santino D'Antonio, who reminds him that he helped John complete his "impossible task", which allowed John to retire and marry Helen. In return, John swore to a "marker", an unbreakable vow symbolized by a "blood oath" medallion. Santino presents the marker to demand services from John, who declines. Santino retaliates by destroying John's house with a grenade launcher. John survives and travels to the Continental Hotel in New York City, where Winston reminds him that if he rejects the marker, he will be violating one of the two unbreakable rules of the underworld: no killing on Continental grounds and honoring every marker. John reluctantly accepts his commitment and meets with Santino, who tasks him with assassinating his sister, Gianna, so he can claim her seat at the "High Table", a council of twelve high-level crime bosses. Santino sends Ares, his mute bodyguard, to observe John's mission.

In Rome, Italy, John infiltrates Gianna's coronation, confronting her in her dressing room. Faced with certain death, Gianna chooses to slit her wrists. As Gianna dies, John shoots her in the head, to end her suffering and to fulfill the marker. As John leaves, Gianna's bodyguard, Cassian, recognizes him, realizes that he was sent to kill Gianna, and attacks him. John flees to the catacombs, where he is double-crossed by Ares and Santino's henchmen, who intend to tie up "loose ends" by killing him. After killing most of the henchmen, John is again pursued by Cassian. Their fight leads them into the Rome Continental's reception area, in which, like the New York Continental, "conducting business" is strictly forbidden. As the two share a drink, John explains his reason for killing Gianna. Nevertheless, Cassian promises John a quick and clean death as a sign of professional respect.

Julius arranges safe passage for John back to New York as Santino opens a contract for $7 million to kill John, ostensibly to avenge his sister. This leads numerous assassins to unsuccessfully attack John, during which Winston visits Santino to complete the marker, thus freeing John from being unable to move against him. Winston warns Santino that he "stabbed the devil in the back" and that he will be unprepared for John's wrath. 

Injured from numerous attempted assassinations, John is then confronted by Cassian in the subway. After a vicious fight, Cassian is left with a knife stuck in his aorta. The badly injured John seeks help from an underground crime boss known as the Bowery King, whose subordinates treat John's injuries. Intrigued by John's intent to kill a member of the High Table, the Bowery King sportingly gives him a gun with only seven bullets, one for each million of the contract, and directs John to an art museum where Santino holds a gala. John pursues Santino throughout the museum, killing his remaining henchmen, including Ares, who gives Santino enough time to escape to the Continental, where he intends to remain indefinitely in its sanctuary. Despite Winston's warnings, the exasperated John shoots and kills Santino in the Continental lounge.

The next day, Winston meets with John and explains that the Camorra has doubled the contract on John, offering it globally. Further, for "conducting business" on Continental grounds, per the High Table's rules, Winston is forced to declare John "excommunicado", terminating all his access and privileges to underworld resources. However, Winston delays activating John's excommunication by one hour (giving him a head start) and provides him with a marker for future use. Before leaving, John advises Winston to warn every other High Table assassin that he will kill anyone who tries to hunt him. John departs with his dog as Winston makes a call enacting John's "excommunicado" to be activated in one hour. As news of the imminent contract disseminates, cellular phones begin to ring all around, and John begins to run.

Cast
 Keanu Reeves as John Wick
 Common as Cassian, Gianna's chief bodyguard
 Laurence Fishburne as "The Bowery King", an underground crime lord
 Riccardo Scamarcio as Santino D'Antonio, an Italian Camorra boss who forces Wick to perform an assassination
 Ruby Rose as Ares, an assassin and Santino's mute security enforcer
 Lance Reddick as Charon, the concierge at the Continental Hotel in New York
 Peter Stormare as Abram Tarasov, Viggo's brother, Iosef's uncle and a deskbound Russian gangster
 Bridget Moynahan as Helen Wick, John's deceased wife
 Franco Nero as Julius, the owner and manager of the Continental Hotel in Rome
 John Leguizamo as Aurelio, the owner of a high-end chop shop
 Ian McShane as Winston Scott, the owner and manager of the Continental Hotel in New York, a key underworld figure
 Claudia Gerini as Gianna D'Antonio, Santino's sister
 Wass Stevens as Consiglieri
 Peter Serafinowicz as the Sommelier, a weapons supplier at the Continental Hotel
 Luca Mosca as an Italian tailor who is responsible for fashion and body armor service at the Continental Hotel
 Tobias Segal as Earl, the Bowery King's "homeless" criminal
 Thomas Sadoski as Jimmy, a police officer who is John Wick's friend
 Chuk Iwuji as Mr. Akoni, who is in debt to or part of the High Table
 Yamamotoyama Ryūta as Rajah
 Erik Frandsen as The Numismatic

Production

Development
In February 2015, directors Chad Stahelski and David Leitch stated that a John Wick sequel had begun development. In the same month, Jon Feltheimer, CEO of Lionsgate, stated during a conference call that "We see John Wick as a multiple-title action franchise". Additionally, it was reported that Kolstad would return to write the screenplay. In May 2015, it was confirmed that a sequel was greenlit, and Lionsgate would be selling the film at the Cannes Film Festival. Reeves and Stahelski appeared in a 30-minute AOL BUILD interview in early February 2017 to discuss the development and casting of the film.

Casting
It was announced that Keanu Reeves, Leitch, and Stahelski would return, with filming set to begin in late 2015. In October 2015, Common joined the film to play the head of security for a female crime lord, and Ian McShane was confirmed to return as Winston, the owner of the Continental Hotel. In November 2015, Bridget Moynahan, John Leguizamo, Thomas Sadoski, and Lance Reddick were confirmed to return, while Ruby Rose, Riccardo Scamarcio, and Peter Stormare were added to the cast (due to Michael Nyqvist having health problems). In December 2015, it was announced that Laurence Fishburne would appear in a supporting role. Reeves was trained in Brazilian jiu-jitsu by the Machado brothers for the role.

Filming
Principal photography on the film began on October 26, 2015, in New York City. At the end of first week, filming had taken place in Manhattan. Filming moved to Rome next and later resumed in Montreal on October 28, 2015. Studio shots were located in New Jersey.

Filming locations
 Continental Hotel in New York - Reality: Beaver Building in Manhattan. The flatiron-shaped 15-story skyscraper was completed in 1904 in the Renaissance Revival style.
 Rooftop of the Continental Hotel in New York - Reality: Roof garden of the Rockefeller Plaza building
 John Wick's house - Reality: 121 Mill Neck, Long Island, NY.
 Continental Hotel in Rome - Reality: the Museo Centrale del Risorgimento, located next to the Roman Forum
 Gianna's coronation party - Reality: the ruins of the Baths of Caracalla, the nearly 1,800 years old Roman public baths.

Music

Tyler Bates and Joel J. Richard returned to write and compose the film's soundtrack. Along with the return of Le Castle Vania and Ciscandra Nostalghia, the soundtrack has also featured Alice in Chains' guitarist and co-lead vocalist Jerry Cantrell in the song "A Job to Do", whose lyrics were written by Cantrell from the perspective of Keanu Reeves' character.

Release

Theatrical
John Wick: Chapter 2 premiered at Arclight Hollywood in Los Angeles on January 30, 2017, and was theatrically released in the United States on February 10, 2017, by Summit Entertainment. In the United Kingdom, the film was granted a 15 certificate by the British Board of Film Classification after 23 seconds of a suicide scene were removed to avoid an 18 rating. The film opened in UK cinemas on February 17, 2017, and was distributed by Warner Bros., with co-production from Lionsgate studio Summit Entertainment. Australia was one of the last major countries to receive the film, with a release on May 18.

Home media
The film was released on DVD, Blu-ray and Ultra HD Blu-ray on June 13, 2017, from Summit Inc/Lionsgate.

Reception

Box office
John Wick: Chapter 2 grossed $92 million in the United States and Canada and $79.5 million in other territories for a worldwide gross of $171.5 million. The film grossed $90.5 million worldwide in its first nine days of release, surpassing the entire theatrical gross of the first film ($88.8 million).

In the United States and Canada, the film opened alongside two other sequels, The Lego Batman Movie and Fifty Shades Darker, and was projected to gross around $20 million in its opening weekend. It earned $2.2 million from Thursday night previews at 2,400 theaters, an improvement over the $870,000 made by its predecessor. It made $11 million on its first day, nearly totaling the $14.4 million the first film made in its entire opening weekend. It went on to open to $30.4 million, more than double the opening weekend of the original film and finishing third at the box office behind The Lego Batman Movie ($53 million) and Fifty Shades Darker ($46.6 million). In its second weekend the film grossed $16.2 million (a drop of 46.7%), finishing 4th at the box office and making more in its second weekend than the original film made in its first.

Critical response
On Rotten Tomatoes, the film has an approval rating of 89% based on 274 reviews and an average rating of 7.40/10. The website's critical consensus reads, "John Wick: Chapter 2 does what a sequel should—which in this case means doubling down on the non-stop, thrillingly choreographed action that made its predecessor so much fun." On Metacritic, the film has a weighted average score of 75 out of 100, based on reviews from 43 critics, indicating "generally favorable reviews". Audiences polled by CinemaScore gave the film an average grade of "A−" on an A+ to F scale, an improvement from the "B" received by its predecessor, while PostTrak reported filmgoers gave it an 85% overall positive score and a 72% "definite recommend".

Scott Tobias of Uproxx said the film improved upon the original, writing: "For better or worse—though mostly for better—it's a full-scale assault on the senses, constantly pushing itself to greater feats of excess. At this rate, a third John Wick might trigger the apocalypse". Mike Rougeau of IGN gave the film an 8.5/10, stating that it "takes joy in expanding on the original's lore", and praised the film as a vast improvement of its predecessor in terms of action set pieces, fight choreography, cinematography, and writing. Peter Travers of Rolling Stone called it "the real deal" and "pure cinema". Byron Lafayette in his review column Under The Lens gave the film 3/5 stars and said "John Wick: Chapter 2 is a fun time to be had, and one that is best seen with a group of friends on the big screen" 

Writing for Time magazine in February Stephanie Zacharek stated: "The pleasures of John Wick: Chapter 2 may be even greater than those of its predecessor—itself a symphonic achievement in scrappy, balls-out, action filmmaking—because in this one, there's no puppy murder to endure...it's lovers of humankind who are put to the test. John Wick: Chapter 2 asks the classic pulp question—Are human beings worth saving?—and delivers, with the right proportions of joy and sorrow, the classic pulp answer: Sometimes, no".

Both Richard Brody writing for The New Yorker and Stephen M. Colbert writing for Screen Rant saw secret societies as a significant motif in the film. In his article "The World of John Wick Explained", Colbert stated: "John Wick introduced audiences to a dark, polished and sharply dressed, underground criminal society full of assassins who (mostly) abide by an unspoken code of conduct and two explicit rules. While the first movie told a more intimate story that only hinted at the larger world of this secret society, John Wick: Chapter Two takes the titular character through several of the corners of this complex underworld, revealing even more about the world of John Wick. While very few of these customs are explicitly explained, there are still enough hints about the inner functionings of the various entities presented, giving us enough puzzle pieces to put together a loose sketch of this mysterious world of assassins".

Ignatiy Vishnevetsky of The A.V. Club wrote that it "lacks the first film's domino-effect momentum". In part, he praised the action scenes as "entertainingly surreal". In an opinion piece, Jordan Hoffman of The Guardian called the film "a shameful example of Hollywood gun pornography" with a "hyperactive, blood-soaked, corpse-strewn video game aesthetic" but "only trace elements of a plot" and wondered "where the line of decency is as audience bloodlust continues to get chummed".

Accolades
At the 2017 Golden Trailer Awards, John Wick: Chapter 2 received a nomination for Best Action with "Vengeance" (AV Squad) and won Best Action TV Spot for "Big Vengeance" (AV Squad). Mark Stoeckinger, Alan Rankin, Andy Koyama, Martyn Zub, and Gabe Serano of Formosa Group was nominated for Outstanding Sound – Feature Film at the 2017 Hollywood Post Alliance Awards. The film received nominations for Empire Award for Best Thriller at the 23rd Empire Awards and Best Stunt Work at the Los Angeles Online Film Critics Society Awards 2017.

Sequel

In October 2016, Stahelski stated that a third film, titled John Wick: Chapter 3 – Parabellum, was in the works and in June 2017 it was reported that Kolstad would return to write the screenplay with the completed film subsequently released in 2019.

Notes

References

External links

 
 
 
 
 

2017 films
2017 action thriller films
American action thriller films
American sequel films
Films about contract killing
Films about secret societies
Films directed by Chad Stahelski
Films scored by Tyler Bates
Films set in New Jersey
Films set in New York City
Films set in Rome
Films shot in New York City
Films shot in New Jersey
Gun fu films
American neo-noir films
Lionsgate films
Summit Entertainment films
Films shot in Montreal
Films with screenplays by Derek Kolstad
2
Films set in museums
Films produced by Basil Iwanyk
Thunder Road Films films
2010s English-language films
2010s American films